Samuel Hufano Gaerlan (born December 19, 1958) is an associate justice of the Supreme Court of the Philippines.  He was appointed by President Rodrigo Duterte to fill Associate Justice Diosdado Peralta's position, which became vacant after Duterte appointed Peralta to be Chief Justice.

Education 

Gaerlan obtained his law degree from the San Beda College of Law.

Career 

Gaerlan served as a Public Attorneys' Office lawyer before becoming a municipal trial court judge in Bangar, La Union and later as a regional trial court judge in Branch 26 of San Fernando, La Union and Branch 92 of Quezon City. He was appointed as a Court of Appeals justice in 2009.

Supreme Court appointment 

Gaerlan had been nominated and interviewed for the seat vacated by Jose C. Mendoza, but was not shortlisted. On January 8, 2020, Gaerlan bested 5 others who made it to the shortlist and was appointed to the court to fill the seat vacated by Diosdado Peralta.

Personal 

References 

Living people
1958 births
Associate Justices of the Supreme Court of the Philippines
Filipino judges
Justices of the Court of Appeals of the Philippines
People from La Union
San Beda University alumni